These are the official results of the Women's 400 metres Hurdles event at the 2001 IAAF World Championships in Edmonton, Alberta, Canada.

Medalists

Results

Heats
Qualification: First 3 in each heat (Q) and the next 4 fastest (q) advanced to the semifinals.

Semifinals
Qualification: First 4 in each semifinal qualified directly (Q) for the final.

Final

References
 Results
 IAAF

H
400 metres hurdles at the World Athletics Championships
2001 in women's athletics